I'm Not Fine Movement (안녕들하십니까) was a South Korean protest against Suseo High Speed Railway and NISgate.

2013 in South Korea
2014 in South Korea
Lee Myung-bak Government
Park Geun-hye Government
2012 South Korean presidential election